Ostrzyca is forested hill in southwestern Poland. The hill has a conical shape and is an extinct and eroded volcano that was active in the Neogene period. More specifically the volcano is a volcanic neck made of basalt. The geology around the hill is composed of sandstone and conglomerate of Permian age. The hill is protected by a nature reserve since 1962.

References

Tourist attractions in Lower Silesian Voivodeship
Landforms of Lower Silesian Voivodeship
Mountains of Poland
Neogene volcanoes
Sudetes
Volcanic plugs of Europe
Volcanoes of Poland
Złotoryja County